Chaetostoma floridablancaensis is a species of catfish in the family Loricariidae. It is native to South America, where it occurs only in Colombia. The species reaches 10.1 cm (4 inches) SL, was described in 2013, and was named for the municipality of Floridablanca in Colombia's Santander Department, the homeland of Carlos A. Ardila Rodríguez, the description's author.

References 

floridablancaensis
Fish described in 2013